Linda Béjar (born 9 June 1937) is a Mexican fencer. She competed in the women's team foil event at the 1968 Summer Olympics.

References

External links
 

1937 births
Living people
Mexican female foil fencers
Olympic fencers of Mexico
Fencers at the 1968 Summer Olympics
Fencers from Mexico City